Everman is a city in Tarrant County, Texas, United States. The population was 6,108 at the 2010 census.

History

Everman is an incorporated residential community on the southern edge of Fort Worth near Interstate 820 in southeastern Tarrant County. Members of the Kiowa, Apache and Wichita tribes inhabited the area until the arrival of Anglo-Americans in the early to middle 1850s. A hamlet named Oak Grove existed in the area for several years. A small community to the east of present-day Everman was known as "Enon". The "Enon" community name had been taken from the Bible. They had a doctor's office, a drug store, and a general store.

Upon the arrival of the International – Great Northern Railroad in 1902, the more established community of Everman Village was developed. The town moved closer to the railway, which was convenient because it gave the citizens transportation and a means to ship freight both to Houston and to Fort Worth, the nearest city. It was much easier and more pleasant to ride the train than to ride a horse, buggy, or wagon. The people named this new community Everman after John Wesley Everman, the man who was the head of the surveying party that platted the town site. A native of Philadelphia, he came to Texas as an engineer for the IGN Railroad and eventually became the general superintendent and assistant general manager for the Texas and Pacific Railway Company. He died in Dallas in 1946 at the age of 85. The names of some of his descendants still appear in the Fort Worth telephone book, though none live in the city of Everman. The original streets were named after the men who were in that survey party: Noble, Trammell, Trice, Parker, and Hansbarger. Enon Street was named after the first settlement. After the railroad was established, the town put up a cotton gin and started a land office business.

In 1905 postal service to the settlement began, and in 1906 Everman established an independent school district. In 1917 the community was one of three sites selected to serve as a flight training school for the Canadian Royal Flying Corps and the United States Signal Corps, Aviation Section. Barron Field, just outside the city, stimulated the local economy and increased population growth. In 1976, the Everman Garden Club obtained a Texas Historical Marker for the Barron Munitions Building, which after the war had served as a schoolhouse for African-American schoolchildren.

By the mid-1920s Everman had eight businesses and an estimated population of 138. In 1924, a fire destroyed the bank, a lodge hall that was over the bank, and a grocery store.

An election was held on July 7, 1945, launching the City of Everman. On August 25, 1945, a mayor, a marshal and five aldermen were elected. W. A. Wilson was the first mayor of Everman, and the first marshal was Buster Stephenson. The five aldermen were W. B. Dwiggins, Jack Neill, Clyde Pittman, Howard Easter and J. W. Bishop. Everman was on her way to becoming a city, but water was needed. Bonds were sold to build a public water supply system, and a volunteer fire department was organized. The city's water was first furnished by Claude Vaughan's well.

In 1948 the name changed from the Village of Everman to the City of Everman.

In 1966 there was another big fire in Everman. This time the town lost the post office, a drug store and a cafe. The businesses rebuilt in another location.

After the nearby Dallas/Fort Worth International Airport was constructed, the number of residents in Everman increased to more than 5,000 by the mid-1970s. Everman adopted the council-manager form of city government in 1986.

Geography

Everman is located at  (32.630284, –97.284267).

Demographics

2020 census

As of the 2020 United States census, there were 6,154 people, 2,126 households, and 1,396 families residing in the city.

2000 census
As of the census of 2000, there were 5,836 people, 1,918 households, and 1,522 families residing in the city. The population density was 2,941.8 people per square mile (1,138.0/km2). There were 1,987 housing units at an average density of 1,001.6/sq mi (387.5/km2). The racial makeup of the city was 54.83% White, 27.72% African American, 0.48% Native American, 1.42% Asian, 0.03% Pacific Islander, 12.58% from other races, and 2.93% from two or more races. Hispanic or Latino of any race were 22.98% of the population.

There were 1,918 households, out of which 40.5% had children under the age of 18 living with them, 55.9% were married couples living together, 18.8% had a female householder with no husband present, and 20.6% were non-families. 17.4% of all households were made up of individuals, and 7.4% had someone living alone who was 65 years of age or older. The average household size was 3.02 and the average family size was 3.40.

In the city, the population was spread out, with 31.4% under the age of 18, 9.5% from 18 to 24, 29.3% from 25 to 44, 20.4% from 45 to 64, and 9.4% who were 65 years of age or older. The median age was 32 years. For every 100 females, there were 93.8 males. For every 100 females age 18 and over, there were 89.5 males.

The median income for a household in the city was $39,021, and the median income for a family was $44,330. Males had a median income of $29,560 versus $22,443 for females. The per capita income for the city was $14,088. About 8.5% of families and 9.8% of the population were below the poverty line, including 13.1% of those under age 18 and 10.7% of those age 65 or over.

Education

The city of Everman is served by the Everman Independent School District. There are five K–4 elementary schools, two intermediate schools (grades 5–6), one junior high school and two high schools. Everman Joe C. Bean High School is home to the 2001 and 2002 Texas 3A State Football champions and the Texas 3A State Boys Basketball champions.

Notable people

 Steven Wayne Smith, Former Texas Supreme Court Justice who served from 2002–2005, was reared in Everman

References

External links
 City of Everman official website
 Everman Independent School District
 Barron Field Texas Historical Marker, at Waymarking.com
 Abandoned & Little-Known Airfields: Texas, Southwestern Fort Worth Area

Dallas–Fort Worth metroplex
Cities in Texas
Cities in Tarrant County, Texas
Populated places established in 1902
Enclaves in the United States